Marcel Di Domenico (born 17 June 1955) was a Luxembourgish footballer who played as a striker.

Club career
He played for Red Boys Differdange, Metz, Hazebrouck and Spora Luxembourg.

International career
A striker, Dussier won 38 caps for Luxembourg over a period of nine years, and scored two goals in the process.

References

External links
 

1955 births
Living people
People from Differdange
Association football forwards
Luxembourgian footballers
Luxembourg international footballers
FC Metz players
CA Spora Luxembourg players
SC Hazebrouck players
Ligue 1 players
Ligue 2 players
Luxembourgian expatriate footballers
Expatriate footballers in France
Luxembourgian expatriate sportspeople in France